Radebe is a South African surname.

Notable people with the surname include:
Archie Radebe (c.1959–2015), South African football player and coach
Bridgette Radebe, South African businesswoman
Charles Radebe (born 1995), South African rugby union player
David Radebe (born 1979), South African football striker
Inny Radebe (born 1995), South African rugby union player
Jeff Radebe (born 1953), South African politician
Lucas Radebe (born 1969), South African footballer 
Ntuthuko Radebe (born 1994), a South African footballer
Samkelo Radebe (born 1989), South African Paralympic sprint runner and high jumper
Senzo  Radebe (born 26 May 1993), South African actor.

Zulu-language surnames